Artatama II was a brief usurper to the throne of king Tushratta of Mitanni in the fourteenth century BC. He may have been a brother of Tushratta or belonged to a rival line of the royal house. His son, Shuttarna III, ruled Mitanni after him.

See also

Mitanni

References

Hurrian kings
14th-century BC rulers